Delmar may refer to:

Places in the United States
Delmar, Alabama
Delmar, Delaware
Delmar, Iowa
Delmar, Maryland
Delmar, Missouri
Delmar, New York
Delmar Township, Pennsylvania
Delmar, West Virginia
Delmar, Wisconsin
Delmar Loop, a neighborhood in St. Louis, Missouri
Delmar Boulevard, namesake of the neighborhood

People
 Delmar (surname)
 Del Crandall (1930–2021), American Major League Baseball player and manager
 Delmar DeLong  (1931–1999), American lawyer and farmer
 Delmar R. Lowell (1844–1912), American minister, Civil War veteran, historian, and genealogist
 M. Delmar Ritchie (1875–1916), American football coach
 Delmar Valleau (1917–2000), Canadian farmer and politician
 Delmar Watson (1926–2008), American child actor and news photographer
 George Koval (1913–2006), American spy for Soviet Union known as "Delmar"

Other uses
 Delmar station (disambiguation)
Delmar (album), the debut album of Argentine rock band Los Natas
Delmar, a shipwreck off the coast of Newfoundland
Delmar Calaboose, listed on the National Register of Historic Places in Clinton County, Iowa
Delmar, a publisher and a division of Cengage Learning

See also
 Delmer (disambiguation)
 Del Mar (disambiguation)
 Delmarva Peninsula